The Miami Times is South Florida's African-American newspaper. The paper was established in 1923  by a Bahamian immigrant, Henry E. Sigismund Reeves.

Sigismund Reeves founded the weekly paper, which he printed on a small hand press in his home.

His son, Garth succeeded him as editor and publisher in 1970, and passed the mantle to his daughter and Sigismund's granddaughter, Rachel Janie Reeves in 1994. The current publisher is Rachel's son, and Sigismund's great-grandson, Garth Basil Reeves III.

After becoming publisher in 1994, Rachel instituted changes to the paper's format, a business decision that enabled it to compete with other local papers like the Miami Herald. She also raised the pay of her staff to attract talent. The change from a tabloid to broadsheet is credited with keeping loyal readers and gaining new ones.

References

External links
Official website

African-American newspapers
Newspapers established in 1923
Newspapers published in Florida
Mass media in Miami
1923 establishments in Florida